San Juan de Duz is one of 13 parishes (administrative divisions) in the Colunga municipality, within the province and autonomous community of Asturias, in northern Spain. 

The population is 170 (INE 2007).

Villages
 Güerres
 San Telmo
 San Xuan

References

Parishes in Colunga